Real Fake (stylized as REAL⇔FAKE) is a Japanese television mini-series that aired on MBS on the channel's programming block, . The series was written and directed by Nobuhiro Mouri, with production by Dub, Inc. The production stars Yoshihiko Aramaki, Keisuke Ueda, Ren Ozawa, Masanari Wada, Ryuji Sato, Ryunosuke Matsumura, Toshiyuki Someya, and Shouta Aoi, all of whom have been involved in 2.5D musicals. A second season titled Real Fake 2nd Stage is scheduled for broadcast on June 15, 2021.

Plot

Stellar Crowns is a project group made up of actors and singers, but one of the members, Akane, disappears before their debut. However, Stellar Crowns' agency gets a tip stating that he is still alive but has been kidnapped by a traitorous member in Stellar Crowns. The president of Queen Record, Sasakida, enlists Hidetoshi Moriya, an aspiring filmmaker and Akane's former classmate, to investigate under a pretense of filming a documentary about Stellar Crowns. Eventually, Moriya learns that Akane's brother, a songwriter, had committed suicide after being targeted by Sasakida, and in order to protect Akane, Stellar Crowns had staged his disappearance. After the truth is discovered, Sasakida is removed from his position from the agency while Akane is made its president.

Characters

Played by: Yoshihiko Aramaki
Nagisa is a member of Stella Crowns. He is a former idol singer struggling to break into acting.

Played by: Keisuke Ueda
Yusuke is a member of Stella Crowns. He is an actor and was a former classmate of Kakeru's. 

Played by: Ren Ozawa
Rin is a member of Stellar Crowns. He is an actor and has mostly appeared on variety shows. He and Reijiro were childhood friends.

Played by: Ryuji Sato
Kakeru is a member of Stellar Crowns. He is a singer from Akane's agency and was recruited as his replacement.

Played by: Ryunosuke Matsumura
Reijiro is a member of Stellar Crowns. He studied and worked abroad as a radio personality in Australia. He is the final person who joined the group.

Played by: Masanari Wada
Masayuki is a member of Stella Crowns. He is a friend of Nagisa and fan of Akane.

Played by: Toshiyuki Someya
Moriya is an aspiring filmmaker and Akane's classmate from high school.

Played by: Shouta Aoi
Akane is popular singer known for his angelic singing voice. He was originally a member of Stella Crowns, but disappears before their debut.

Production

Real Fake began airing on MBS as part of their programming block, on September 2, 2019, and later aired on TBS on September 4, 2019. The series is written and directed by Nobuhiro Mouri and produced by Dub, Inc. The cast features actors who have previously acted in 2.5D musicals. The opening theme song is "Real Fake" by the main cast as their characters, credited as Stellar Crowns with Akane. The ending theme song is "Fake of Fake" by Shouta Aoi, which was released as a B-side on his single "Harmony."

A second season titled Real Fake 2nd Stage was announced in December 2020 and scheduled for broadcast in 2021, with the original cast reprising their roles. Ren Ozawa was removed from the cast following his domestic abuse allegations. On April 9, 2021, Hiroki Ino and Hiroki Sasamori were added as regular cast members and 2nd Stage was announced to be broadcast beginning June 15, 2021. The opening theme is "Rumor" by Stellar Crowns with Akane and the ending theme is "Glass no Kutsu" by Shouta Aoi. 2nd Stage is directed by Tōru Yamashita, with Yō Kosaka in charge of script.

Episodes

Season 1 (2019)

Soundtrack

Cheers, Big Ears! is a studio album produced for Real Fake featuring songs performed by the main cast as their characters. The limited version of the album included an exclusive DVD and an alternate cover. The album charted at #18 on the Oricon Weekly Album Charts and sold 7,319 copies on its first week.

Notes

References

External links
 
 Official MBS TV website

2019 Japanese television series debuts
2019 Japanese television series endings
Fictional musical groups
Japanese drama television series
Mainichi Broadcasting System original programming